Swamp adder may refer to:

 Proatheris superciliaris, a small viper found in East Africa.
 The fictional Indian venomous snake in Arthur Conan Doyle's "The Adventure of the Speckled Band", in which the snake’s victim dies within 10 seconds. It is referred to as the most venomous snake in India.